The term mobile to mobile calling is used in many mobile phone plans to refer to making calls to other mobile phones using the same provider's network--which is often cheaper than other calls.

Mobile to mobile convergence (MMC) is a term to describe a technology used in modern computing and telephony.  The term is an offshoot of fixed mobile convergence (FMC) and uses dual mode (cellular network and WiFi) phones with a special software client and an application server to connect voice calls and business applications via a VoWLAN and/or through a cellular service.  

Mobile to mobile convergence differs from conventional FMC in that the technology uses the WLAN to route calls via the internet as a primary function, and uses the wireless carrier network if the WLAN is not present as a secondary function.  It is significant since it is viewed as a means to compete with carrier companies since the calls are routed around the cellular network.  This is viewed as a more efficient use of networking technology than standard FMC solutions that are available as well, since most of the latter use the carrier network as the primary means of communication and do not leverage the lower cost and controls of internet protocol-based networks that are generally installed at most modern businesses.  In theory, it also provides the capability of providing a greater voice coverage area than either carrier or WLAN technology alone since some areas do not have cellular service coverage and others do not have WiFi.

The first offering known in the market successfully deploying MMC is beCherry, which is delivered by Belgian company Mondial Telecom. They offer an MMC solution on Symbian, iOS and Android. Other smartphone OS's are also considered.

See also
Fixed-mobile convergence
Convergence (telecommunications)
Computer network

Mobile technology